Breweries in the Upper and Lower Peninsulas of Michigan produce a wide range of beers in different styles that are marketed locally, regionally, nationally, and internationally. In 2012 Michigan's 120 brewing establishments (including breweries, brewpubs, importers, and company-owned packagers and wholesalers) employed 595 people directly, and more than 36,000 others in related jobs such as wholesaling and retailing. Altogether, 140 people in Michigan had active brewer permits in 2012. Michigan beer marketing and coordination is generally handled by the Michigan Brewers Guild.

, the total business and personal tax revenue generated by Michigan's breweries and related industries was more than $900 million (including people directly employed in brewing, as well as those who supply Michigan's breweries with everything from ingredients to machinery). Consumer purchases of Michigan's brewery products generated more than $290 million in tax revenue, and the state ranked 13th in the number of capita per craft brewery with 122 craft breweries, and 81,013 capita per craft brewery.

Brewing companies vary widely in the volume and variety of beer produced,  from small nanobreweries and microbreweries to massive multinational conglomerate macrobreweries. For context, at the end of 2013 there were 2,822 breweries in the United States, including 2,768 craft breweries subdivided into 1,237 brewpubs, 1,412 microbreweries and 119 regional craft breweries.  In that same year, according to the Beer Institute, the brewing industry employed around 43,000 Americans in brewing and distribution and had a combined economic impact of more than $246 billion.

Breweries

Lower Peninsula 
Arbor Brewing Company – Ann Arbor, Ypsilanti, Plymouth
B. Nektar – Ferndale
Baffin Brewing Company - Saint Clair Shores
 Bell's Brewery – Kalamazoo and Comstock
Bier's Inwood Brewery – Charlevoix
Brew Detroit – Detroit
Brooks Brewing - Shelby Township and Ferndale
Constantine Brewing Company – Constantine
Dark Horse Brewery – Marshall
Detroit Beer Company – Detroit
Dragonmead – Warren
Eternity Brewing Company – Howell
Founders Brewing Company – Grand Rapids
Four Leaf Brewing – Clare
Grand River Brewery – Jackson
Gravel Capital Brewing Company - Oxford
Greenbush Brewing Company – Sawyer
Griffin Claw Brewing Company - Birmingham
Guardian Brewing Company – Saugatuck
Jolly Pumpkin Artisan Ales – Dexter 
Kuhnhenn Brewing Company – Warren
Latitude 42 Brewing Company – Portage
Liberty Street Brewing Company – Plymouth
Midland Brewing Company - Midland
Midtown Brewing Company – Lansing
New Holland Brewing Company – Holland
OpenRoad Brewery – Wayland
Right Brain Brewery – Traverse City
Reed City Brewing Company - Reed City
Rochester Mills Beer Company – Rochester
Saugatuck Brewing Company – Douglas, Kalamazoo
Schmohz Brewing Co – Grand Rapids
Short's Brewing Company – Bellaire
Stormcloud Brewing Company – Frankfort
Tenacity Brewing Co. – Flint
The Mitten Brewing Company – Grand Rapids
Transient Artisan Ales
Tri-City Brewing Company – Bay City
Witch's Hat Brewing Company – South Lyon
Wolverine State Brewing Co. – Ann Arbor

Upper Peninsula 
 Alpha Michigan Brewing Company – Alpha
Blackrocks Brewery – Marquette
Keweenaw Brewing Company – Houghton
 Ore Dock Brewing Company – Marquette
 Upper Hand Brewery – Escanaba

Closed breweries
 Axle Brewing - Ferndale, Michigan
 E&B Brewing Company - Detroit, Michigan
 Falling Down Beer Company - Warren, Oxford 
Goebel Brewing Company - Detroit, Michigan
Grand Valley Brewing Company – Ionia
 The Hideout Brewing Company - Grand Rapids  
 Michigan Brewing Company – Webberville
 Richter Brewery – Escanaba
 Sebewaing Brewing Company - Sebewaing, Michigan which was briefly known as "The Michigan Brewing Company.
 Stroh Brewery Company – Detroit
 Upper Peninsula Brewing Company – Marquette

See also 
 Beer in the United States
 List of breweries in the United States
 List of microbreweries

References

Further reading

External links 
 MittenBrew.com - Michigan Beer News Website 

Michigan
Beer brewing companies based in the Upper Peninsula of Michigan
Breweries